Nesna Church is a parish church of the Church of Norway in Nesna Municipality in Nordland county, Norway. It is located in the village of Nesna. It is the main church for the Nesna parish which is part of the Nord-Helgeland prosti (deanery) in the Diocese of Sør-Hålogaland. The white, neo-gothic, wooden church was built in an octagonal cruciform style in 1880 using plans drawn up by the architect Niels Stockfleth Darre Eckhoff. The church seats about 480 people.

History
The earliest existing historical records of the church date back to the year 1589, but the church altarpiece is dated from the 1470s, so the church likely was founded around that time. In 1666, the church inspection said that the building was in need of major repairs which were likely carried out soon afterwards. In 1750, the church was described as very neglected. In 1767, the old church was torn down and a new church was constructed on the same site. It was a timber-framed, cruciform building that was painted red on the exterior.

In 1814, this church served as an election church. Together with more than 300 other parish churches across Norway, it was a polling station for elections to the 1814 Norwegian Constituent Assembly which wrote the Constitution of Norway. This was Norway's first national elections. Each church parish was a constituency that elected people called "electors" who later met together in each county to elect the representatives for the assembly that was to meet in Eidsvoll later that year.

After the new church was completed, the old church was torn down and the materials were sold. The new church was consecrated on 17 September 1880. This new building was also a cruciform shape, but slightly modified. The inner corners of the cruciform design were cut off, forming more of an octagonal central area.

Media gallery

See also
List of churches in Sør-Hålogaland

References

Nesna
Churches in Nordland
Wooden churches in Norway
Cruciform churches in Norway
Octagonal churches in Norway
19th-century Church of Norway church buildings
Churches completed in 1880
15th-century establishments in Norway
Norwegian election church